William Godson (1766 – 19 August 1822) was an attorney in Tenbury, Worcestershire, and elected one of the county's coroners in 1809.

His wife was Margaret Probyn (1766–1832). His son Richard Godson (1797-1849) was member of Parliament for St Albans in 1831-32 and then Kidderminster 1832-34 and 1837-1849. His son, Septimus Holmes Godson (1799-1877), was a British barrister who was called to the bar at Gray's Inn in 1837. His son Stephen practised as an attorney at Worcester and died 9 June 1839.

References 

English lawyers
British coroners
Worcestershire
William
1766 births
1822 deaths